Paul Mercier (14 February 1888 – 10 August 1943) was a Liberal party member of the House of Commons of Canada. He was born in Montreal, Quebec and became a lawyer.

Mercier attended school at Montcalm, then Sainte-Therese College and Université Laval. He was appointed as King's Counsel in 1922.

He was first elected to Parliament at the Westmount—St. Henri riding in the 1921 general election. After riding boundary changes in 1924, Mercier was re-elected at the new St. Henri electoral district in the 1925 federal election, then re-elected there in 1926, 1930 and 1935 (in 1933, the riding's English name became "St. Henry").

On 29 November 1937, Mercier accepted an appointment to become a Montreal region Circuit Court judge, leaving the House of Commons before completing his term in the 18th Canadian Parliament.

References

External links
 

1888 births
1943 deaths
Canadian King's Counsel
Judges in Quebec
Lawyers from Montreal
Liberal Party of Canada MPs
Members of the House of Commons of Canada from Quebec
Politicians from Montreal
Université Laval alumni